Safety Bay Senior High School is a public co-educational high day school, located in the southern Perth suburb of Safety Bay, Western Australia, on Malibu Road, approximately  south of the Perth central business district.

The school was established in 1978 and caters for students from Year 7 to Year 12. The school consists of a middle school for Years 7, 8 and 9 students and a senior school for Years 10, 11 and 12 students.

Total enrolments at the school have declined from 1,177 in 2009, to 1,021 in 2010, 978 in 2011, 954 in 2012 and then increased to 1,000 in 2013.

See also

 List of schools in the Perth metropolitan area

References

External links 

Public high schools in Perth, Western Australia
1978 establishments in Australia
Educational institutions established in 1978